Cold Rock Ice Creamery is an Australian-owned ice cream parlour chain. The company's main product is centred around customers choosing combinations of ice cream and various other confectioneries, which are mixed in front of the customer within their store. With reportedly 30,000 plus combinations, Cold Rock sells their ice cream as individual ice cream combinations in a cup, cone, take-home pack, loaded shake, or ice cream cakes.

The previous management team purchased the Australian Franchise System of Cold Rock in August 2002 and is attempting to present Cold Rock as the "premier ice cream franchise in Australia".

In 2008, Cold Rock opened its eightieth store in Melbourne, Victoria. The Cold Rock franchise is currently owned and managed by the Franchised Food Company.

In May 2017 Cold Rock launched "Super Kosher" ice creams and mix-ins. It was the first time an Australian franchising targeted its products for the Jewish/kosher market.

In 2019, the chain was forced to close several stores due to rising costs, including stores in Indooroopilly and Springwood in Queensland, putting pressure on the franchise.

References

External links

Ice cream parlors
Restaurants established in 1996
Dairy products companies of Australia
Companies based in Brisbane
Restaurant chains in Australia
Ice cream brands